Piazza Vittorio Emanuele II, also known as Piazza Vittorio, is a piazza in Rome, in the Esquilino rione.  It is served by the Vittorio Emanuele Metro station.

Description
Surrounded by palazzi with large porticoes in the 19th-century style, the piazza was built by Gaetano Koch shortly after the unification of Italy.  Umbertine in style, it is the largest piazza in Rome (316 x 174 metres).  In the centre of the piazza is a garden with the remains of a fountain built by Alexander Severus (so called Trophy of Marius), and the Porta Alchemica (Alchemist's Portal or also called Magic Gate or Porta Magica), the entrance to Villa Palombara, former residence of the alchemist Marquis Palombara.

Cultural References
In Vittorio De Sica's Bicycle Thieves (Ladri di biciclette), it was in Piazza Vittorio that the protagonist Antonio Ricci and his young son Bruno seek desperately to recover his stolen bicycle, but realise the futility of their task as the vast square is filled with countless bicycles and bicycle parts that resemble his own.

Gallery

See also
List of city squares by size
 Piazza Venezia, in front of the Victor Emmanuel II Monument

References

Vittorio Emanuele II
Rome R. XV Esquilino